Australoprocta is an extinct genus of dasyproctid rodent that lived during the Early Miocene of what is now Argentina. Fossils of this genus have been found in the Chichinales and Sarmiento Formations of Argentina.

References 

Dasyproctidae
Hystricognath rodents
Prehistoric rodent genera
Miocene rodents
Miocene first appearances
Miocene genus extinctions
Miocene mammals of South America
Colhuehuapian
Neogene Argentina
Fossils of Argentina
Fossil taxa described in 1998
Chichinales Formation
Golfo San Jorge Basin
Sarmiento Formation